Bonnell is both a surname and a given name. Notable people with the name include:

Surname:
Barry Bonnell (born 1953), former outfielder and third baseman in Major League Baseball
Bonnie Bonnell (1905–1964), Vaudeville performer
Bruno Bonnell (21st century), one of the founders of Infogames Entertainment 
Dawn Bonnell, American materials scientist and engineer
Joseph Bonnell (1802–1840), U.S Army Officer and Republic of Texas Officer
Lorne Bonnell (1923–2006), Canadian physician, provincial politician, and senator
Max Bonnell (born 1962), Australian lawyer and cricket historian
Megan Bonnell, Canadian musician
Sadie Bonnell (1888–1993), first woman to win the Military Medal
Steve Bonnell (21st century), punk rock musician
Steven Kenneth Bonnell II (born 1988), Twitch streamer and gaming personality
Yolanda Bonnell, Canadian actress and playwright

Given name:
Bonnell Thornton (1725–1768), English poet, essayist, and critic
Ulrich Bonnell Phillips (1877–1934), American historian